Leon "Bull" Durham (born July 31, 1957) is an American former first baseman and outfielder in Major League Baseball who played for 10 seasons. Durham was a longtime minor league hitting coach, and most recently served as the assistant hitting coach for the Detroit Tigers during the 2017 season. Durham played with the St. Louis Cardinals (1980, 1989), Chicago Cubs (1981–1988), and Cincinnati Reds (1988). Durham batted and threw left-handed.

Early life
Durham graduated from Cincinnati Woodward High School in 1976 where he was a high school All-American selection his senior year, posting a .385 batting average with 16 home runs and an 11-3 record as a pitcher.

Playing career

Durham was selected by the St. Louis Cardinals in the 1976 amateur draft in the first round and 15th overall.

Durham made his major league debut on May 27, 1980 with the St. Louis Cardinals. He was traded that off-season to the Cubs for Bruce Sutter, and his career took off. He hit 10 home runs and drove in 55 runs in a strike-shortened 1981 season, then followed that with a stellar 1982 season in which he had a .312 batting average with 22 homers, 90 RBI, and 28 stolen bases. He won the Silver Slugger Award as the Cubs' left fielder and made the All-Star team. He followed that with a hot first half in 1983 of 12 homers and 55 RBI and another All-Star Game appearance, but was injured shortly after the break and missed the rest of the season.

In 1984, the Cubs made several team-improving deals. They acquired Bob Dernier and Gary Matthews from the Phillies, moved Keith Moreland to right field, and Durham to first base.  Durham essentially supplanted Bill Buckner, who was then dealt to the Red Sox for Dennis Eckersley. Durham responded with another stellar year by hitting .279 with 23 homers and 96 RBIs as the Cubs won the National League East.  For good measure, Durham homered in both Games 4 and 5 of the 1984 NLCS. Durham would follow that season with three more consecutive 20-homer seasons, including a career-high 27 in 1987.  However, his RBI totals decreased from 96 in 1984 to 75, 65, and 63, respectively.

In 1988, Durham got off to a miserable start, hitting only .218 with 3 homers after 21 games. Mark Grace began to see more time at first, and the Cubs traded Durham to the Cincinnati Reds for Pat Perry amid rumors of drug use. Durham played in only 21 games for the Reds that season before entering into drug and alcohol rehabilitation. He tried a comeback with the Cardinals the next season, but only went 1 for 18 before retiring.

In a 10-year Major League career, Durham compiled a lifetime batting average of .277, hitting 147 home runs and driving in 530 runs. He recorded an overall .991 fielding percentage playing primarily at first base and all three outfield positions.

1984 National League Championship Series
Leon Durham is widely remembered for an error that he made at first base during the 1984 National League Championship Series. In the bottom of the seventh inning in the decisive fifth game between Durham's Chicago Cubs and the San Diego Padres, the Padres sent pinch-hitter Tim Flannery to face the Cubs' ace pitcher Rick Sutcliffe.

Through the top of the sixth inning, the Cubs had a 3-0 lead, aided by Durham's home run off Eric Show in the first inning. In the bottom of the sixth inning, the Padres cut the Cubs' lead to 3-2 with a pair of singles by Alan Wiggins and Tony Gwynn, a walk to Steve Garvey, and sacrifice flies by Graig Nettles and Terry Kennedy. The bottom of the seventh inning kicked off with Carmelo Martínez walking on four pitches from Sutcliffe. Garry Templeton then sacrificed Martínez to second, setting things up for Tim Flannery. Martinez would then score when Flannery hit a sharp grounder that trickled through Leon Durham's legs for an error.

The error became known as the "Gatorade Glove Play" because before taking his position in the field that inning, Gatorade was spilled on Durham's glove. Some Cub fans believe the Gatorade spilled on Durham's glove amounted to a curse, similar to the goat and Bartman curses of Cub lore.

The play would also turn out to be very similar, in style and effect, to Bill Buckner's much-discussed error in the 1986 World Series. The coincidental connection between these two events is that Durham had been moved from the outfield to first base during the 1984 season, replacing Buckner after the Cubs traded him to the Boston Red Sox for pitcher Dennis Eckersley. Buckner's error, like Durham's, would be seen as turning a post-season series around. The same joke even circulated for both incidents: That they had been despondent, jumped in front of a moving truck, and "the truck went between their legs".

The Padres wound up winning the game 6-3 to reach the World Series for the first time ever. The Cubs had won the first 2 games of the series (1984 marked the last time that the League Championship Series was a best-of-five series) over the Padres. Incidentally, Durham went 3-for-20 in the NLCS, garnering two of his three hits in the final two games on home runs (his shot in Game 4 had given the Cubs a 3-2 lead).

In 1993, Durham played for the then Northern League's Saint Paul Saints.

Coaching career
Durham previously served as the hitting coach for the Detroit Tigers' Triple-A affiliate the Toledo Mud Hens. On October 21, 2016, he was named the assistant hitting coach of the Detroit Tigers, after 17 seasons as a coach with the Mud Hens. Durham is presently in his second year as the hitting coach for the Louisville Bats the Triple-A affiliate of the Cincinnati Reds.

In other media
Durham had a supporting role as Leon Alexander, a member of the Minnesota Twins, in the film Little Big League.
Durham appears briefly in the movie Ferris Bueller's Day Off. He is the first baseman in the sequence where Braves outfielder Claudell Washington hits a foul ball caught by the eponymous character.

References

External links

1957 births
Living people
African-American baseball coaches
African-American baseball players
American expatriate baseball players in Canada
American expatriate baseball players in Mexico
American sportspeople in doping cases
Arkansas Travelers players
Baseball coaches from Ohio
Baseball players from Cincinnati
Baseball players suspended for drug offenses
Chicago Cubs players
Cincinnati Reds players
Detroit Tigers coaches
Gastonia Cardinals players
Gulf Coast Cardinals players
Louisville Redbirds players
Major League Baseball first basemen
Mexican League baseball players
Minor league baseball coaches
National League All-Stars
Olmecas de Tabasco players
St. Louis Cardinals players
St. Paul Saints players
St. Petersburg Cardinals players
Reales de San Luis Potosí players
Salinas Spurs players
Silver Slugger Award winners
Springfield Redbirds players
Vancouver Canadians players
Woodward High School (Cincinnati, Ohio) alumni
21st-century African-American people
20th-century African-American sportspeople